Pykara is river  from Ooty in the Indian State of Tamil Nadu with a village by the same name nearby. The Pykara River is considered very sacred by the Todas. It rises at Mukurthi peak, flows northwards, and then turns to the west after reaching the edge of the plateau. The river flows through Murkurti, Pykara and Glenmorgan dams, and forms part of an important hydro-electric power project.

There is a forest rest house at Pykara. A boat house on the Pykara reservoir is an added attraction for tourists. Pykara boasts well-protected, fenced sholas, Toda settlements, large grassy meadows and good wildlife habitat. The Pykara Dam, falls and reservoir attract many tourists.

Climate
Pykara features a subtropical highland climate (Cwb) under Köppen climate classification. Pykara, due to its location in the Nilgiris, gets rain from both the monsoons. The wet season runs from April to December and the dry season from January to March.

Dam and power station

The dam is near the main Ooty–Gudalur road and includes a power station. One of the oldest power plants in south India, the Pykara station still functions, generating about 60 megawatts. The first unit of 6.65 MW was commissioned in October 1932. Sir C.P. Ramaswamy Aiyar, Diwan of Travancore, worked with the British regime in 1920s and 1930s in the setting up of the Pykara project. A team of engineers led by H.G.Howard, a chief engineer in the then electricity department, was responsible for carrying out the project. The Bengaluru-Chennai industrial region is highly dependent on the Pujara hydroelectric plant.

The Pykara Station, declared as a heritage plant in September 1997, triggered the establishment of more hydro-electric power stations in the state. Today, the Nilgiris district alone boasts hydro-electric stations with an aggregate installed capacity of 837 MW. Five decades after establishment of the old plant, the Electricity Board (EB) authorities came up with a plan for the Pykara Ultimate Stage Hydro Electric Plant (PUSHEP), containing three units of 50 MW each. According to the EB, the hydraulic head is the highest in Asia.

Boat house

A boat house on the Pykara Reservoir is an added attraction for tourists. The boat house with restaurant is maintained by Tamil Nadu Tourism and Development Corporation. It consists of several boats and has motor boats which are allowed for 20 minutes and speed boats which are allowed for 10 minutes.

Image gallery

References

External sources

Rivers of Tamil Nadu
Geography of Ooty
Waterfalls of Tamil Nadu
Tourist attractions in Nilgiris district
Tourist attractions in Ooty
Rivers of India